Leonardo Morosini (born 13 October 1995) is an Italian footballer who plays as an attacking midfielder for  club Virtus Entella.

Club career

Brescia 
Morosini was a youth exponent from Brescia Calcio. He made his senior debut for the club on 10 May 2014 against Reggina Calcio in a Serie B game.

Genoa 
On 5 January 2017, Morosini signed for Serie A side Genoa. He will wear the number 32 jersey.

Return to Brescia
On 26 June 2018, he returned to Brescia, signing a 4-year contract.

Loan to Ascoli
On 16 January 2020, he was loaned to Serie B club Ascoli until the end of the 2019–20 season.

Entella
On 1 October 2020, he moved to Virtus Entella.

International career 
He made his debut with the Italy U21 team on 11 October 2016, in the last 2017 European U21 Championship qualification match against Lithuania in Kaunas.

Honours

Club 
 Serie B: 2018–19

Individual 
Serie B Footballer of the Year: 2015–16

References

External links 
 
 

1995 births
Living people
Sportspeople from the Province of Bergamo
Footballers from Lombardy
Italian footballers
Association football midfielders
Serie A players
Serie B players
Serie C players
Brescia Calcio players
Genoa C.F.C. players
U.S. Avellino 1912 players
Ascoli Calcio 1898 F.C. players
Virtus Entella players
Universiade gold medalists for Italy
Universiade medalists in football
Italy youth international footballers
Italy under-21 international footballers